"Justice" is the third episode of science fiction sitcom Red Dwarf Series IV and the twenty-first episode in the series run. It was first broadcast on the British television channel BBC2 on 28 February 1991; although it was planned to be broadcast as the second episode, it was moved back in the schedule by the BBC. Written by Rob Grant and Doug Naylor, and directed by Ed Bye, the episode features the crew's visit to a high-tech prison where Rimmer is charged with the death of the Red Dwarf crew.

Plot
Whilst Dave Lister spends a week in the medibay with a bout of space mumps, Red Dwarf picks up an escape pod from a prison ship that was transporting dangerous criminals. Lister and Cat discover the pod belongs to one Barbara Bellini, and in his eagerness to meet her Cat activates the one-way thaw process. Arnold Rimmer and Kryten discover this and inform the others they learned that the ship suffered a revolt that destroyed it and only two people managed to escape – female prison guard Barbara Bellini, and a psychotic mass-murdering simulant. Unsure as to which of the two is in the pod, the group are forced to transport it to the prison ship's assigned destination of Justice World – a prison complex that held trials for criminals, sentenced them for the crimes they committed and incarcerated them within, punishing them by making any crime they commit happen to themselves. Upon arriving, the complex's computer system scans the groups' minds, and convicts Rimmer on 1,167 counts of second-degree murder – the total number that died on Red Dwarf from his faulty drive-plate repair – sentencing him to 9,328 years imprisonment within the complex.

The group opt to prove that Rimmer was not responsible, to which Kryten defends him to the computer's Judge, claiming that Rimmer's immense guilt stems from his own inflated sense of importance, and that he would never have been given the task in the first place if he was known to have been incompetent and insignificant. Despite being deeply offended by Kryten's defence, Rimmer is found not guilty and allowed to go. Before the group can leave, they discover that the pod opened in their absence and that the psychopathic simulant had been within it, now coming to hunt them down. Lister opts to confront it, but struggles to hurt it until he recalls how Justice World works, thus taunting the simulant to attack him and be harmed in response to its "crimes", eventually dying from its own attempt to strangle Lister. Upon returning to Red Dwarf, Lister questions the futility of absolute justice, much to his friends' dislike, only to fall down an open manhole when he isn't looking.

Production
Taking influence from their own Red Dwarf novels, writers Rob Grant and Doug Naylor altered some of the historic facts of the show. This was to improve the backstory and keep it in line with their vision of the story as seen in the novels. In "Justice" we discover one of these adjustments is that the ship crew complement before the accident was 1,169 (the 1,167 "murdered" crew plus Rimmer and Lister) instead of the 169 stated in previous series.

Initially "Justice" was to feature the Justice World as a planet, but due to time constraints and finance it was seen as a space station instead. The ending was also changed at the last minute, after a scene earlier in the episode was cut where a giant bird dropping lands on Lister after he littered in the Justice Zone gardens. Lister's speech about man's sense of justice was subsequently added to the end.

The writers' vision of the Justice Zone was with a background that appeared to disappear into infinity. This was perceived as impossible to achieve with the budget available so a compromise was reached. A huge light was placed at the back of the set masking the background limitations and giving the illusion that there was nothing behind.

For the futuristic Justice Zone set the crew used the nearby Sunbury Pumphouse, a disused water pumping plant near the Shepperton studios. The set would provide the corridor settings and steps for the Justice Zone scenes. Guest performers included Nicholas Ball who played the simulant and James Smilie who voiced the Justice Computer.

Cultural references
Florence Nightingale is referenced by Lister when he comments that Kryten has been "like Florence Nightingdroid" looking after him while he had space mumps. Lister thinks that he could disguise himself with a turban and say he's from India, whereas the Cat replies saying he could paint orange and black stripes on the side and tell her you play quarterback for the Bengals. He also states that he looks more like the Taj Mahal and later references The Elephant Man.  In defending Rimmer's innocence Kryten references Long John Silver.

On the side of the simulant's gun is written 'Make My Day' in reference to the famous line "Go ahead, make my day" from the film Sudden Impact.

The simulant's overall appearance is reminiscent of the Borg from the Star Trek franchise, whilst his accent references the replicant Roy Batty in the film Blade Runner.

Reception
The episode was first broadcast on the British television channel BBC2 on 28 February 1991 in the 9:00pm evening time slot, although it originally planned to be broadcast as the second episode – as seen in the repeat runs. It was moved in the schedule because the Gulf War hostilities meant that "Dimension Jump" and "Meltdown" were postponed. The episode had received a lukewarm reception from viewers, although it has been described as a "classic episode" by others.

Notes

References

External links

Series IV episode guide at www.reddwarf.co.uk

Red Dwarf IV episodes
1991 British television episodes